Henry Bailey Pierce was a Massachusetts insurance executive and politician who served as Secretary of the Commonwealth from 1876 to 1891.

Early life
Pierce was born on August 6, 1841 in Duxbury, Massachusetts.

Family life
Pierce married three times, first to C. Elvira Carew, they were married on October 19, 1861, she died on April 9, 1862. Pierce then married Augusta Arnold on December 31, 1865, she died on February 10, 1882. On April 25, 1883 Pierce married his third wife Fanny B. Pease.

Children
Pierce had two children, Eugene E. Pierce, born on April 16, 1868, and Anne G. Pierce, born May 31, 1877.

Military service
Pierce served in the 23rd Regiment Massachusetts Infantry Volunteers during the  American Civil War. Pierce enlisted on October 14, 1861 and he was discharged on July 10, 1865.

Massachusetts Secretary of the Commonwealth
Pierce served as Massachusetts Secretary of the Commonwealth for sixteen years, from 1876 to 1891.

Business career
Pierce was the president of the Abington Mutual Fire Insurance Company, and the Boston manager or the American Surety Company.

Death
Pierce died at his home in Abington, Massachusetts in April 1898.

References

External links
New York Times Obituary

People from Duxbury, Massachusetts
People of Massachusetts in the American Civil War
Secretaries of the Commonwealth of Massachusetts
1841 births
1898 deaths
People from Abington, Massachusetts
Massachusetts Republicans
19th-century American politicians